Kahaani Ghar Ghar Kii ( The story of each house) is a Hindi-language Indian soap opera on Indian television which ran on Star Plus from 16 October 2000 to 9 October 2008. The soap opera was created by Ekta Kapoor and was produced by her production company Balaji Telefilms which starred Sakshi Tanwar and Kiran Karmarkar. 

The show explored the worlds of Parvati and Om Agarwal, living in a Marwadi joint family where Parvati is an ideal daughter-in-law of Agarwal family and Om the ideal son. The show is the story of the sons of Vishwanath Agarwal and their children thereof. The show also had Ali Asgar who played the role of Kamal Agarwal, Anup Soni who played the role of Suyash Mehra, Shweta Kawatra/ Achint Kaur who played the role of Pallavi Agarwal as the major supporting cast.

Plot Summary
The show is based mostly on their life and struggles in a joint family. The story, spread over three generations, focuses majorly on Parvati and her struggles as the ideal wife, daughter-in-law, mother and grandmother and depicts how sometimes one must stand against her loved ones to do what is morally right. The story ends on the day of Dussehra with the family celebrating and highlighting the triumph of good over evil.

It all begins with the happy Agarwal family. Vishwanath Agarwal comments on how he has always treated the daughters and daughters-in-law of the house with the same love and respect. He gives his oldest daughter-in-law Parvati his "mala." She says that she doesn't think she should receive it, but he gives it to her anyway. He tells her that this is because he thinks of her as the cord that goes through the chain holding all the beads together. These happy times are soon disrupted when Vishwanath's third son Ajay Agarwal refuses to marry the daughter of reputed businessman Mr. Bhandari. Babuji tells Ajay that he can either marry Pallavi Bhandari or leave the Agarwal house for good. Ajay opts to leave and, in a time of turmoil, Kamal steps forward to save the family and Pallavi from humiliation and agrees to marry her. The day Pallavi enters the house Parvati is busy shifting a glass structure from one place to another. Pallavi walks in and she and Parvati collide. The structure collapses, shattering into a million pieces. Pallavi smiles secretly and hopes that from this day forth, whatever goes wrong in this house will go wrong because of her. Pallavi begins her venomous attack on the Agarwals and makes Parvati's life a living hell. Soon; because of the unknown conspiracies laid in by Pallavi; Parvati, Om and Shruti leave the house. Yet before too long Parvati and Chhaya run their own conspiracy against Pallavi and she is caught red-handed by the entire family in her evil scheme. Chaaya reveals to the family that she and Parvati planned this whole thing so that everyone would see how twisted Pallavi really was. Soon Kamal takes Pallavi back to her father's house and leaves her there saying that this is where she belongs. Meanwhile, the family brings Parvati and Om back home and the two of them are finally happy again. But before too long, Parvati goes to the Bhandari residence and brings Pallavi back as well. Pallavi asks Parvati how she could bring home the woman who threw her out, but Parvati tells her that they are family and they have to be together always.

Time goes on and Om brings home his good friend's blind daughter, Khushi Kantilal Shah, after her father passes away. The family vows to take care of Khushi now that she's alone in the world. However, on the night of a celebration party for Khushi, she is raped. Before long Parvati finds out that Om's cousins, Devin and Rohan Garg, were the ones responsible for this heinous crime. But unfortunately the men of the family and Anamika believe Devin and Rohan, and Ajay fights the case for them. On the day of the first court hearing, Ajay smirks that there is no one to fight on the side of the prosecution and then is shocked when Avantika shows up in court ready to battle. After a bad day in court when Avantika seems to be losing her way, she almost gives up when Parvati gives her guidance by telling her that when it comes to choosing between the routes of your Dharm and Karam, you have to always choose your Karam because one's Karam is their greatest Dharm. The case drives a huge wedge between the husbands and wives but when it comes to a focal point where it seems Devin and Rohan will get off scott free, Om shows up in court with Anamika who produces a letter, which was given to her by Devin, claiming that he and Rohan did rape Khushi. Devin screams out that he can't believe Anamika did this, especially after she promised to burn the letter. His statement seals Avantika's case and the brothers are sent to jail.

Not long after the family is thrown out of the house by Pallavi who's now out for revenge once again and plots to obtain the property and while living in a small run-down house, Om has a nervous breakdown. He yells at Parvati and everyone else and is soon admitted into hospital. Parvati is told that they need a huge sum of money for his treatment and she doesn't know what to do. That night there is a deadly storm and Dadi reads the Ramayan to Om in tears. In her reading she says that there came a weak moment when Mother Sita did what she was not supposed to do and crossed the Lakshman Rekha. At that very moment Parvati and Pallavi come face to face, and in a storm of tears over the storm that rumbles around them, Parvati falls at Pallavi's feet and tells her that she won and Parvati lost. Parvati says that Pallavi was right all along and that money is everything and that now she needs money to save Om. Parvati begs of Pallavi to give her the money and says that she will do just about anything because she realizes that money is everything. Pallavi is on an automated high seeing the ever-strong Parvati Agarwal fall at her feet. She carries Parvati up and wipes her tears away asking her to come inside the house. Thus, Parvati joined forces with Pallavi and Chhaya and Pallavi even gives Babuji's position in the office to Parvati. But unknown to Pallavi, another conspiracy is taking place. Parvati and Chhaya are working together to help the Agarwals get back everything they've lost. Parvati calls Om under the guise of Ambika Sharma and gives him information that could drive Pallavi into the ground. During this time however, Parvati becomes Pallavi's greatest strength and confident. But soon Gaurav finds out what Parvati is really up to and informs Pallavi about it. Pallavi then turns the tables and blackmails Chhaya into keeping her mouth shut so when Parvati goes back to her house to reclaim her right as the bahu of the family and tell them what she's been doing for them all along, no one believes her and Chhaya denies everything that Parvati says. Parvati screams blue murder and says that she will not go through the Agni Pariksha because she knows that she is telling the truth and thereafter she leaves the house for good. But time goes on and soon everything falls back into place. Om goes to Parvati's Nani's house to bring his wife back home and Nani makes Om promise that something like this will never happen again. When Parvati arrives back home she sees Babuji trying to leave and then tells him that he did nothing wrong and says that this house won't be a house without him. Soon the family is back together but Parvati sees the tension that has mounted amongst the family members in her absence. She sees the friction between Gaurav and Kamal, the pettiness between Shilpa and Avantika and she fears that all is not right yet.

But time moves on and everything settles down again and before we know it 20 years have gone by. Kamal's son Krishna comes back home after a long stay overseas and everyone is overjoyed to see him. Shruti meets Aryan, the love of her life and with his entrance into the story we also welcome back his parents-Sanjay and Mallika hoshi. Events go from hither to hence and soon Shruti is getting married to Aryan. On the day of the wedding, Parvati leaves the house with Monalika and Dadi because of the dark revelation that Monalika is carrying Aryan's child. Shruti marries Aryan nevertheless and soon after, discovers that an accident has caused Parvati lose her face. The new Parvati then pays Pallavi a visit and Pallavi thinks that this is an actor hired by Parvati to confuse her. Pallavi offers her a great deal of money if she comes to work for her and even goes to get her cheque book but at that moment Parvati sees her reflection in the mirror and is shocked at the fact that her face has changed and then Pallavi is really confused. Meanwhile in Australia, while on her honeymoon, Shruti sees a woman who's face is an exact replica of Parvati's old face. They soon discover that this is Swati Dixit, a lawyer who lives in Australia with her brother and his sons. Before too long, Om joins Shruti and Aryan where he meets Swati's nephew Saumil. The minute Om sees Swati his heart skips a beat and he is shocked beyond belief. Time goes on and confusion rises over and above when Swati makes her entrance in the Agarwal mansion and everyone is shocked beyond belief. She is introduced to everyone and then she asks to meet Parvati but Shruti and Om manage to coin an excuse. Later Swati goes to Parvati's room to change a saree and both she and Parvati come face to face. There's a huge mode of drama Parvati is shocked to see her old face. But as time went on the situation was resolved and it was uncovered why Parvati and Swati did what they did and the family is at peace again until the deaths of Rohan and Devin in the plane crash that also took Smriti's life. The new faced was real Swati Dixit and old faced was none other than Parvati Om Agarwal.

On the day of the funeral, a group of bikers storm the city and ride along side a black car. The five guests arrive at the Agarwal mansion and the woman introduces herself as Garima Garg, Devin's legal wife. She introduces her children Sasha and Machan, and then Rohan's children Neel and Rob. Babuji is shocked and says that Anamika is Devin's wife but Garima says that Anamika was just the other woman because even though she married Devin, he hadn't legally ended his marriage to Garima. The family is taken aback by this and so the Gargs come to live with the Agarwals under one roof. In a series of unfortunate events that follow, the family loses everything to Sasha who plays a game of cards with Krishna laying Gunn down as the bet. While this little game takes place the adults of the family are with Babuji in Bangalore where he breathes his last. Krishna loses the game to Sasha and Gunn curses him for what he has done. And so began the reopening of the Mahabharat to regain what was lost. The Gargs are disposed of and all goes back to normal but then the reality of Om's extramarital affair with Trishna comes out. But Om never liked Trishna, he did everything to help her recover from her fiance's death. Om dies in a tragic accident and it is later revealed to Parvati that this was no accident at all, rather a murder. Parvati takes up the MD post of the company and butts heads with business tycoon Suyash Mehra. As time goes by the two become good friends and also during this time Kamal is married off to Trishna. But then Parvati receives a CD that makes her believe Suyash was responsible for Om's death. She then marries Suyash Mehra in a twisted attempt to get her revenge and tortures him in numerous ways. Once she has thrown him in jail she comes face to face with his ex-wife Rajeshwari who gets him out. Meanwhile, Trishna is married to Kamal.

Parvati breaks her marriage with Suyash Mehra and returns to Agarwal house as Om's widow. By this time it has been revealed that Shruti and Gayatri were exchanged at birth and Gayatri is Parvati and Om's real daughter. Shruti has married Sameer and Gayatri has run away with her baby. Suyash tries to tell Parvati that Om's killer lives with her in her house but she doesn't believe him. Then comes the baby switch wherein Sunaina gives her baby to Shruti and Shruti gives her baby to Gunn with the secret kept between the three of them and Parvati. After a blood and DNA report Krishna finds that he is not the father of Gunn's child and believes that she has cheated on him with Nikhil Mehra. He brings home a report and tells everyone that if this report is wrong he will lay down his life. Not long after Krishna uncovers Om's real killer. He is about to tell Parvati the truth when Rajeshwari shoots him. Krishna is assumed dead and, soon after, Trishna pays Rajeshwari a visit to threaten her but then reveals her true identity as the woman who was responsible for the deaths of Om and Krishna. Another conspiracy is afoot but Parvati finally finds out from Chhaya's husband Vikram that Trishna is the real killer. Parvati confronts her on this and the two face off and Trishna states her plan to seek revenge. However, Trishna and Rajeshwari plan things out so well that Parvati is framed for both murders of Om and Krishna and is arrested. Before she leaves the house she tells her granddaughter Pragati that she has to take care of the family like Parvati did. Before leaving, the wicked Trishna reminds Parvati that she has lost everything now and Parvati says that she still hasn't lost her faith in God. Trishna says that God should give man everything except for misunderstandings. Parvati goes to prison and, some time later, her death is reported.

Another 20 years pass. The newest generation of Agarwals, comprising Parvati's grandchildren, grandnieces and grandnephews, grows up. Trishna governs the household and has reduced everyone else to the position of slaves or dependents, regularly humiliating and torturing them. Kamal is a broken man and an alcoholic. Shruti hates the memory of Parvati, whom she sees as Om's killer. The strong values and traditions which Parvati had nurtured have been driven out of the house. Into this mayhem steps Jhanki Devi, a Parvati look-alike and a fabulously rich woman who stands no nonsense and knows how to fight back for her rights and dignity. Gradually, she challenges Trishna's power, and eventually succeeds in taking over the control of the Agarwal family. It is revealed that Jhanki is in fact Parvati, who had survived and taken a new identity in order to avenge Om's killers and save her family. But her problems continue as the family has been corrupted and broken by Trishna's evil influence. A new twist in the story comes with the return of Om, who had survived but lost his memory twenty years ago. Taking advantage of his condition, a woman named Rishika had given him the identity of her husband Rishabh. For the past 20 years, Om had believed himself to be Rishabh. After much struggle, Parvati succeeds in reminding Om of who he really is, much to Rishika's dismay. The soul-mates are at last reunited. Now there is one final war between Parvati and all her enemies. Her love for Om and her family members becomes Parvati's biggest strength. In the end, good triumphs over evil. Trishna is arrested, Om comes back and Parvati finds her long lost grandson. Peace returns to the Agarwal family as misunderstandings are cleared, broken hearts are mended and Parvati continues to watch over everyone in her family with the same care and devotion as before, ending her journey on a satisfied and happy note.

Cast

 Sakshi Tanwar as Parvati Om Agarwal / Parvati Suyash Mehra / Janki Devi / Swati Dixit / Ambika
 Kiran Karmarkar as Om Agarwal
 Mohnish Behl / Anup Soni as Suyash Mehra
 Shweta Kawatra / Achint Kaur as Pallavi Bhandari / Pallavi Kamal Agarwal / Pammi Balraj Nanda
 Lily Patel as Rukmani (Dadi) Kedarnath Agarwal
  Jyotsna Karyekar as Nani 
  Deepak Qazir as Vishwanath (Babuji) Agrawal(Dead)
  Nayan Bhatt as Krishna (Maaji) Vishwanath Agarwal
 Neelam Mehra as Vandana Agarwal  (Vandy Maasi)
 Aruna Irani as Narayani Devi
 Ali Asgar as Kamal Agarwal 
 Tina Parekh as Shruti Agarwal
 Shweta Basu Prasad as Young Shruti Agarwal
Naveeda Mehdi as Khushi
 Sachin Sharma / Sameer Sharma as Krishna Agarwal (Dead)
 Poorva Gokhale / Rujuta Deshmukh / Pallavi Subhash Chandran as Advocate Gunn Krishna Agarwal
 Malavika Shivpuri as Mansi ( Deven Rohan And Yash Sister)
 Aamir Ali / Mazher Sayed as Sameer Kaul
Abhay Vakil/Bobby Bhonsale as Parth
 Mita Vashisht as Trishna Kocchar / Trishna Kamal Agarwal
 Deepak Bajaj as Nikhil Mehra
 Smita Bansal as Nivedita Kamal Agarwal(Dead)
Ananya Khare/Rajeshwari Sachdev/Tisca Chopra as Ambika/ Mallika Sanjay Doshi/ Mallika Vajpay
 Romanchak Arora /Sandeep Rajora as Neeraj Agarwal
 Aparna Jaywant as Mitali Agarwal
 Kapil Soni as Vishal Oberoi
 Sheetal Thakkar as Preeti Agarwal/Preeti Vishal Oberoi
Kiran Dubey as Rajeshwari Suyash Mehra
 Jaya Seal as Swati Dixit
 Rinku Dhawan as Chhaya Agarwal 
 Abdul Shaibaz as Young Suyash Mehra 
 Manav Gohil / Prakash Ramchandani as Vikram
  Gautam Chaturvedi as Gaurav Agarwal
  Neelam Sagar / Surbhi Tiwari / Suchita Trivedi / Jaya Mathur as Shilpa Gaurav Agarwal
Rajeev Paul as Deven Garg
Karishma Randhawa / Addite Shirwaikar Malik/ Arunima Sharma as Sonu / Sunaina Gaurav Agarwal/Sonu Mehta
 Prabhat Bhattacharya as Advocate  Ajay Agarwal (Dead)
 Kusumit Sana / Sweta Keswani / Nivedita Bhattacharya as Avantika Ajay Agarwal (Dead)
 Manish Goel as Tushar (Sonali's Husband)
Smita Kalpavriksha as Sonali 
Priya Wal as Aditi Agarwal
 Aashish Kaul as Rohan Garg
 Ali Hassan as Aryan Doshi
 Kavita Kaushik as Manya Doshi
Samar Jai Singh as Harpreet Gill 
Amit Rampal as Sanjog Harpreet Gill
Gargi Sharma as Gurbani Harpreet Gill
 Shabbir Ahluwalia as Saumil Umesh Dixit
 Chetan Hansraj as Shashank (Sasha) Garg
 Reena Kapoor as Srishti
 Kanika Maheshwari as Neelima (Neel) Garg
 Diwakar Pundir as Sambhav Khanna (Dead)
 Rupali Ganguly as Gayatri Om Agarwal 
 Tannaz Irani as Mita
Shivangi Sharma as Gauri Ishaan Agarwal/ Gauri Ishaan Kaul
 Adita Wahi / Preeti Gupta as Mayuri Shikhar Mehra 
 Rohit Bakshi as Shikhar Mehra
 Archana Bhatt Malkani as Pragati Agarwal/Pragati Akash Sharma
 Jeetu Malkani / Nivaan Sen as Pranay Kaul
 Shalini Chandran as Maithili Pranay Kaul
  Jatin Shah as Vikramaditya (Adi) Mehra
 Shraddha Musale / Praneeta Sahu as Malishka 
 Akshita Kapoor as Tanu Kaul 
 Urmila Tiwari as Sunaina Rai Chaudhary
  Parul Juneja as Neha Varun Mehta
Varun Khandelwal as Varun Mehta
  Gaurav Gupta as Ronit Agarwal
 Ali Merchant as Bharat Agarwal
 Mandar Degvekar as Tiny Agarwal
 Barsha Chatterjee as Shivangi Ishaan Kaul
  Suhaas Ahuja as Sharath (Sissy) Raj Nanda
 Panchi Bora as Prachi Mishra (Guest appearance )
 Madhura Naik as Tanya (Sam) Nanda 
 Rocky Verma as Manager Waghale
 Sanjeet Bedi as Advocate Kothari
 Shraddha Nigam as Advocate Ambika
 Garima Bhatnagar as Garima Rai Chaudhary
 Mukul Dev as Vijay Agarwal
 Hrishikesh Pandey as Advocate Natkarni
 Anang Desai as Balraj Nanda 
 Tarana Raja as Siri
  Sai Ballal as Avantika's Father
 Salim Shah as Inspector Krishna Kanth (K.K.)
 Sushmita Mukherjee as Romilla Nanda 
 Shubhavi Choksey as Advote Rishika Rai Chaudhary 
 Rajeev Bharadwaj / Karan Patel as Vigyaat Agarwal
 Puneet Vashisht as Viraj Agarwal 
 Harsh Chhaya as Sandeep Sickand
 Poonam Joshi as Chhavi
 Surekha Sikri 
Jayati Bhatia as Dr Shweta
 Kundan Waghmare
 Vivek Mushran as Bhushan Kaul
 Bharat Chawda as Ishaan/Chotu
 Manasi Varma as Monalika Agarwal
Kwaljeet Singh as Machan Garg
Raj Singh Arora as Ashu Mehra
  Rituraj Singh as Sanjay Doshi
 Sikandar Kharbanda as Yash Garg
 Indira Krishnan as Anjana Harpreet Gill
Bhuvnesh Mann as Ankit/Akash Sharma
 Saonal Sharma
 Sanjeev Tyagi
 Shweta Tiwari as Prerna
 Sara Khan as Sadhna
 Parul Chauhan as Ragini
 Sanaya Irani as Gunjan
 Arjun Bijlani as Mayank

Soundtracks 
The music of the series is composed by Lalit Sen and sung by  Priya Bhattacharya while the lyrics of the title track are written by B M Vyas.

Production

Development
Initially, Kahanii was offered to Zee TV. However, when they declined the offer, it was picked up by Star Plus.

Sakshi Tanwar was initially offered the role of  a sister in law Parvati by Ekta Kapoor while playing the role of a sister in law in Karam Apnaa Apnaa which she rejected as she thought her role of a sister in law could not be the lead. Even when she was given narration of the story she rejected again as it required her to play the role of a mother to a teenager. Then, when Kapoor reduced the age of the characters in story by 10 years, Tanwar rejected again as she was not willing to shift from Delhi to Mumbai for her daily soap shooting considering her routine would become affected. After discussions with Kapoor she decided to shoot for 15 days in Mumbai in a month for it so that the other days she could stay in Delhi.

When the ratings of the series slightly declined, Kapoor decided and on 15 November 2006, the story took a generation leap of 18 years.

Filming
Kahaani was initially shot at sets of Balaji House in Andheri. Then, in January 2003 it was shifted to Sankraman Studio, studio number eight A at Goregaon and later changed into killick nixion studio set number 6. In September 2007, due to the dipping viewership, considering the current set location unlucky and the previous set Sankraman lucky, Kapoor decided and shifted it back there. Some sequences of the series was also shot at foreign locations in Australia.

Crossover
On 19 June 2006, Kahaani had a crossover with Kkavyanjali. In 2007 and 2008, the series had a crossover with Kyunki Saas Bhi Kabhi Bahu Thi.

Reception

Critics
The series was critically acclaimed during its premiere for showcasing the actual joint family concept and the problems faced by the new generations in joint family. The way in which the storyline was adopted was widely appreciated.

When it ended, The telegraph stated both the positive and negative aspects of the show saying," A by and large credible storyline and identifiable characters. Unlike Tulsi, Parvati, played by Saakshi Tanwar, was human and vulnerable and that endeared her to viewers. Repetitive plot points and too many characters towards the end. The Agarwal family plunged from one crisis to another. The viewer plunged from boredom to frustration."

Ratings
This series which aired at a night slot of 10:00 pm (IST) is regarded as the second most highest rated soap after Kyunki Saas Bhi Kabhi Bahu Thi which mostly dominated the top positions in Hindi GEC for about seven years. These made StarPlus and Ekta Kapoor's Balaji Telefilms reach greater reach at that time.

Three weeks after its premiere the show was amongst top three shows on Indian Television the other two being Kyunki Saas Bhi Kabhi Bahu Thi and Kaun Banega Crorepati.

The series became one of the most watched shows during 2001 and 2002 with an average TRP of 10+ TVR. In week 24 2002, it was the second watched Hindi GEC with 10.41 TVR and the following week it became the most watched Hindi GEC with 9.03 TVR pushing Kyunki to second position.

In September 2003, the series took a leap of 18 years in the storyline while the ratings spiked around 10+TVR before which it around 9 TVR before leap.

In the Year 2002 and 2003, the series toppled Kyunki Saas Bhi Kabhi Bahu Thi to become the top show on Indian Television.

In the Year 2004, after the first generational leap of 20 years the TRP of the show shoot as high as 18+ that was a feat achieved by none other show before except Kyunki Saas Bhi Kabhi Bahu Thi (which had a record of generating a TRPof 22+)! In the same year during the rape hearing scene the TRPs of the show shoot the highest making it top show continuously for several weeks on the ratings charts.

On 15 November 2006, the series took another generational leap of 18 years when the ratings of the series started to decrease. The protagonist Parvati Aggrawal (Sakshi Tanwar) returned from dead as Janki Devi to take the revenge from Trisha (Mita Vashisht) who damaged her family and made the elders of her family - the servants! The series was applauded for enacting such a storyline which had the connect with 21st century! One of the episodes aired soon after it garnered 15.34 TVR and its last highest rating before was 12.55 TVR in January 2006. The firett episode on 15 November 2006 after the leap had more than 12 million viewership.

Also Sakshi Tanwar was applauded for her portrayal as Janki Devi, a break for her and audience who saw her enacting Parvati Aggrawal for continuous 6 years! Even Mita Vashisht was applauded for her portrayal as antagonist Trisha. The ratings of the series went high when Sakshi Tanwar returned as Janki Devi.

During early 2008, it ranged between 4 and 5 TVR maintaining its top position. However soon, it dipped and ranged between 2 and 2.5 TVR losing its top spot. On week ending 4 October 2008, it garnered 2.41 TVR occupying ninenth position. The decreasing ratings since of the series made it to go off air on 9 October 2008.

Once, when the TVR had a slight drop of 1 TVR, despite being a top show, Kapoor became angry such that she even was in a temper to shut the show. However, the cast and crew reshoot the upcoming sequences for 16 hours such that Kapoor was satisfied.

The series went off air on 9 October 2008 after completing 8 successful years, where in the last episode, the protagonist Sakshi Tanwar was seen passing on the baton to Puja Banerjee (the protagonist of another show Tujh Sang Preet Lagai Sajna that replaced Kahaani Ghar Ghar Kii).

Impact
Protests evoked by Jagori, a women's group, in May 2002 for depiction of the raping a blind girl Khushi where the rapist justifies the crime as punishment for not respecting him, in the episode aired on 21 May 2002.

In February 2003, The Times of India reported that the people started recreating the grand sets of the series in their homes at Kolkata.

In June 2008, a sequence was in making, reported to be inspired from the ongoing 2008 Noida double murder case then, where the lead character Parvati's granddaughter Tanu played by Akshita Kapoor and her boyfriend Andy were to be murdered. The victim's mother Nupur Talwar requested the National Commission for Protection of Child Rights (NCPCR) to stop Balaji Telefilms from airing the sequence, saying that the production house was trying to earn TRPs by exploiting a tragedy. However, the production house refused to change the script stating the sequence not being inspired from that case while there were some similarities reported between both. The similarities between those reported by Mumbai Mirror were: "The body of Tanu's boyfriend is found inside the house just as the body of the servant was found on the terrace, in Aarushi's case. In the show as in reality, Tanu's ashes will be immersed in Haridwar just like Aarushi's. Also, the drama will focus on a family member's involvement in the murder. Like Aarushi's mother, Parvati will be shown giving interviews to the media. The show has also incorporated the element of the MMS from Aarushi's case and the CBI probe into the case."

When Balaji Telefilms refused to drop the track, NCPCR's member Sandhya Bajaj after Talwar's complaint, in a letter to Information & broadcasting (I&B) secretary Asha Swarup, said, "Balaji Telefilms’ move would glorify the concept of “honour killings”. They should not be allowed to make a serial on Aarushi murder case till the investigations are over. Otherwise, it will amount to influencing the investigation and the outcome of the case," Following the complaint and I&B ministry meeting with Star TV, they ordered Star to withhold the episode telecast. Then, Star instructed Balaji Telefilms as per I&B's letter to alter the track accordingly. Soon, the track was altered regarding which Creative head, Nivedita Basu stated, "Well, Andy will not die; only Tanu will be bumped off. So there is no double murder like that of Aarushi and Hemraj. Moreover, we also removed the word 'honour killing' from the episode. Now the track will be of a 'who-dun-it', where every character in the Agarwal family will be a suspect."

Rerun

It starts to re-telecast whole series from 2 August 2022 at 3:30 pm on same channel which telecasted original run on StarPlus.But, it is not aired for everyday and ended 21 September 2022 because replaced by Saath Nibhaana Saathiya at same timeslot.

Awards

References

Indian television soap operas
StarPlus original programming